LCFC can stand for:

 Lancaster City F.C., an English football club
 Leicester City F.C., an English football club
 Lichfield City F.C., an English football club
 Lincoln City F.C., an English football club
 Little Common F.C., an English football club
 Liverpool County Football Combination, an English football league
 London Caledonians F.C., a former English football club
 London Colney F.C., an English football club
 Louisville City FC, an American professional soccer club
 Lowest Common Factorial of Crime, a modern form of mathematical, criminal justice